ReMastered: Who Killed Jam Master Jay? is a 2018 documentary film about the killing of Run DMC's Jam Master Jay, who was shot in a Jamaica, Queens recording studio in 2002.

Premise
The documentary looks into the case of when DJ Jam Master Jay was killed at the age of 37. Despite six witnesses present at the scene of the crime, no one has ever been convicted. Jam Master Jay's friends and family speculates about the circumstances of the late DJ's unsolved murder.

Cast
 Jason Mizell
 DJ Hurricane
 Rahman Dukes
 Darryl McDaniels
 David Seabrook
 Russell Simmons
 Marvin Thompson
 Trini Washington
 50 Cent
 Beastie Boys
 Gerald Ford
 The Notorious B.I.G.
 NWA
 Public Enemy
 Paul Shaffer

References

External links

 
 
 

2018 documentary films
2018 films
Netflix original documentary films
2010s English-language films